KNJ may refer to:
Kindamba Airport (IATA: KNJ), Republic of the Congo
Akatek language (ISO-639-3: knj), a Mayan language spoken in Guatemala
Krishnanagar City Junction railway station (station code: KNJ), India
Kodomo no Jikan, Japanese manga and anime series

See also
:de:Kameradschaftsring Nationaler Jugendverbände, a neo-Nazi organisation